Compsura is a genus of characins containing two described species.  One species occurs in Panama (C. gorgonae), and the other in eastern Brazil.

Species
 Compsura gorgonae (Evermann & Goldsborough, 1909)
 Compsura heterura C. H. Eigenmann, 1915

References
 

Characidae